The 2012 World Junior Figure Skating Championships was an international figure skating competition in the 2011–12 season. Commonly called "World Juniors" and "Junior Worlds", the event determined the World Junior champions in the disciplines of men's singles, ladies singles, pair skating, and ice dancing. The event was held in Minsk, Belarus from 27 February to 4 March 2012.

Qualification
The competition was open to skaters from ISU member nations who were at least 13 but not 19—or 21 for male pair skaters and ice dancers—before July 1, 2011, in their place of birth. Thus, competitors had to be born before July 1, 1998, but not earlier than July 1, 1992, except male pair skaters and ice dancers who could be born no earlier than July 1, 1990. National associations selected their entries according to their own criteria.

The term "Junior" in ISU competition refers to age, not skill level. Skaters may remain age-eligible for Junior Worlds even after competing nationally and internationally at the senior level. At junior events, the ISU requires that all programs conform to junior-specific rules regarding program length, jumping passes, types of elements, etc.

Number of entries per discipline
Based on the results of the 2011 World Junior Championships, the ISU allowed each country one to three entries per discipline. Countries which qualified more than one entry in a discipline:

If not listed above, one entry was allowed.

Entries
Member nations submitted the following entries: Elizaveta Tuktamysheva withdrew and was replaced by Polina Shelepen.

Some skaters were required to compete in a preliminary round, while others received a direct entry into the short program, after which the number of entries could be reduced further. If a country had a non-direct entry, its lowest-ranked skater according to the Worlds Standings competed in the preliminary round.

Schedule
Minsk time (UTC+03:00), subject to changes:

 Monday, February 27
 10:00–14:30 – Preliminary round: Men
 15:30–18:20 – Preliminary round: Dance
 19:15–22:10 – Preliminary round: Pairs
 Tuesday, February 28
 10:00–16:00 – Preliminary round: Ladies
 Wednesday, February 29
 13:00–16:50 – Short dance
 18:30–19:00 – Opening ceremony
 19:15–22:35 – Pairs' short
 Thursday, March 1
 13:30–17:55 – Men's short
 19:30–22:20 – Pairs' free
 Friday, March 2
 13:00–17:25 – Ladies' short
 19:00–22:10 – Free dance
 Saturday, March 3
 13:00–16:50 – Men's free
 18:30–22:15 – Ladies' free
 Sunday, March 4
 14:30–17:00 – Exhibitions

Results

Men

Ladies
Despite finishing out of the top 12, Belarus' Kristina Zakharanka qualified for the short program as she was the representative of the host country.

Pairs
Sui / Han won their third World Junior title.

Ice dancing
All medalists were at their first World Junior Championships. In the free dance, Yanovskaia / Mozgov's music was stopped by the referee when Mozgov's bootstrap came loose.

Medals summary

Medalists
Medals for overall placement:

Small medals for placement in the short segment:

Small medals for placement in the free segment:

By country
Table of medals for overall placement:

Table of small medals for placement in the short segment:

Table of small medals for placement in the free segment:

References

External links

 2012 World Junior Championships - Starting orders and results at the International Skating Union
 2012 World Junior Championships - Entries and schedule at the International Skating Union

World Junior
World Junior Figure Skating Championships
World Junior 2012
World Junior Figure Skating Championships